Jack Clarke was a New Zealand long-distance athlete who won a bronze medal representing his country in the marathon at the 1950 British Empire Games.

Athletics
Clarke took up running in 1943, and by 1947 he had won both the Canterbury cross-country championship and the Canterbury three-miles track title in three successive years. In 1945, he finished third in the New Zealand national cross-country championship. In 1948, Clarke won the marathon at the New Zealand athletic championships held in Dunedin, recording 2:44:06, the second-fastest winning time in the championship's history at the time.

Despite not completing the marathon course at the 1950 national championships in Napier, Clarke was one of four runners selected to represent New Zealand in the marathon at the 1950 British Empire Games the following month in Auckland. In that event, Clarke won the bronze medal in a time of 2:39:26, despite having a large dog snapping angrily at his heels at one stage of the race.

In 1952, Clarke won his second national marathon title, in a time of 2:38:42.

Other activities
Clarke was farm manager for the Roydon Lodge Stud, established by John McKenzie in 1927, at Yaldhurst on the western outskirts of Christchurch. He was also jointly responsible for maintaining the training track. In 2018, it was proposed that a new road in the Yaldhurst Park subdivision be named Jack Clarke Road.

References

External links
 

Year of birth missing
Year of death missing
New Zealand male long-distance runners
Athletes (track and field) at the 1950 British Empire Games
Commonwealth Games bronze medallists for New Zealand
Commonwealth Games medallists in athletics
Medallists at the 1950 British Empire Games